Unava is a village located near Unjha, in Mehsana district of Gujarat, India. It is on the SH41 (Mehsana-Palanpur). Unava is about 40 km from Palanpur if visitor is coming via Rajasthan and 90 km from Ahmedabad via Maharashtra route.

Unava has a large population of both Hindus and Muslim Communities. Unava is well known for Saiyed Ali Mira Datar shrine.

Mira datar and religious belief
Every year, lakhs of devotees and followers across the world visit Saiyed Ali Mira Datar shrine. Interesting fact is that followers across the world have firm belief that Unava Sharif shrine is the final destination to all the victims suffering from black magic, unknown mysterious diseases, incurable physical and psychiatric problems. First-time visitors are surprised to see hundreds of psychiatric patients doing strange activities. Their family members believe the pious force of Saiyed Ali Mira Datar is capable of destroying diabolic forces.

Sufi Saint Huzoor Saiyed Ali Mira Datar was born on 29th of Ramadan,879  and was martyred on 29th of Muharram, 898. He was martyred in the battle of  Mandavgad. As he generously gave his life to save the lives of thousands of innocent people, a famous poet has given him the title of Mira( meaning brave) and Datar(meaning the one who gives). Although his birth name was Saiyed Ali, he is famously known as Saiyed Ali Mira Datar.
 +919879997866

History 

The name Unava is derived from Una, which was founded in back in 19th century by "Una" Rabari.

Demographics 
Gujarati is the local language.

Education 
Unava has total 10 School, government and private both.
Shri H.P. Patel High School
Shri Miradatar sarvodaya highschool
Unava Primary School - 4
Unava Pri School No - 2
Laxmipura (unava) Pri School
Unava Pri Kanya School - 1

Population 
Unava is a large village with total 2749 families residing. The Unava village has population of 12901 of which 6701 are males while 6200 are females as per Population Census 2011.

In Unava village, the population of children with age 0-6 is 1384 which makes up 10.73% of total population of the village. The Average Sex Ratio of Unava village is 925 which is higher than Gujarat state average of 919. Child Sex Ratio for the Unava as per census is 772, lower than Gujarat average of 890.

Unava village has higher literacy rate compared to Gujarat. In 2011, literacy rate of Unava village was 91.66% compared to 78.03% of Gujarat. In Unava Male literacy stands at 95.95% while female literacy rate was 87.12%.

Governance 
As per the constitution of India and Panchyati Raj Act, Unava village is administrated by Sarpanch (Head of Village) who is the elected representative of village.

Economy 

Most people are farmers and also earn money from selling agricultural products to the market yard of Unjha.

Milk and product 
People have many buffaloes, cattle, ships, etc. They sell milk in Sahakari Limited. Milk and dairy products are produced and sold.

Job 
People are often employed in cities like Unjha and Mehsana.

References

Villages in Mehsana district